Xu Jing (late 140s - September or October 222), courtesy name Wenxiu, was a Chinese politician of the state of Shu Han in the early Three Kingdoms period of China. After Liu Zhang announced his submission to Liu Bei, Xu Jing swore his allegiance to Liu Bei. Like his cousin Xu Shao, Xu Jing was famous for being a good character evaluator. However, the cousins could not get along with each other. Before falling out with each other, they would give comments on certain persons or topics on the first day of every month.

After Liu Bei was declared himself emperor and established the Shu Han state in 221, he appointed Xu Jing as Minister over the Masses, an office ranking just below Imperial Chancellor (held by Zhuge Liang). Xu Jing died in 222 after holding office for about one year or less. The office of Minister of the Masses wasn't filled after Xu's death.

As Xu Jing's elder brother once served under Chen Ji, Xu Jing was on good terms with Yuan Huan, Hua Xin and Wang Lang. After Cao Cao was made Duke of Wei in 213, Hua Xin, Wang Lang and Chen Qun (Chen Ji's son) served as important officials of Wei. Despite their difference allegiances, the three frequently exchanged warm letters with Xu Jing, reminiscing about the past.

Chen Zhi was a maternal grandson of an elder brother of Xu Jing. As Chen was orphaned at a young age, he was raised by Xu Jing.

See also
 Lists of people of the Three Kingdoms

References

 Chen, Shou (3rd century). Records of the Three Kingdoms (Sanguozhi).
 Pei, Songzhi (5th century). Annotations to Records of the Three Kingdoms (Sanguozhi zhu).

Year of birth unknown
222 deaths
Han dynasty politicians from Henan
Liu Zhang and associates
Politicians from Zhumadian
Political office-holders in Chongqing
Political office-holders in Sichuan
Officials under Liu Bei
Shu Han politicians
Shi Xie and associates